Naval Air Station Agana is a former United States Naval air station located on the island of Guam. It was opened by the Japanese Navy in 1943 and closed by the United States government in 1995. During and after its closure, it was operated alongside Antonio B. Won Pat International Airport.

History

The airport was built by the Japanese Navy about 1943, calling the military airfield Guamu Dai Ni (Guam No. 2) as part of their defense of the Marianas.  After the island was recaptured by American forces in 1944, it was renamed Agana Airfield, due to the proximity of the town.

After being repaired in October 1944, the United States Army Air Forces Seventh Air Force used the airfield as a base for the 11th Bombardment Group, which flew B-24 Liberator bombers from the station until being moved to Okinawa in July 1945.   With the reassignment of the heavy bombers, the 41st Photographic Reconnaissance Squadron flew long range reconnaissance aircraft (F-4 versions of the P-38 Lightning) from the field until January 1946.

After the war, the USAAF used the airfield for fighter defense of the Marianas (21st Fighter Group, 549th Night Fighter Squadron) until early 1947 and as a transport hub (9th Troop Carrier Squadron).  In 1947, the USAAF turned over the airfield to the United States Navy, which consolidated its facilities with those at the closing Harmon Air Force Base in 1949, and operated Naval Air Station Agana until it was closed by the 1993 Base Realignment and Closure (BRAC) Commission.

In 1992, Angel Santos and other Chamorro Nation members staged a protest outside the base. The protest was staged in response to the frequent low-altitude US military training flights that disturbed Chamorros living near the air station. At the protest, Santos read a statement criticizing the US military and their operations. The protest escalated when Santos and others jumped the fence surrounding the naval air station, in front of gathered local media and members of the US military. Santos spat in the face of the US military policeman who arrested him.

See also

 USAAF in the Central Pacific

References

External links
 
 Resources for this airport:
 
 
 
 

Agana
Airports in Guam
Airfields of the United States Army Air Forces in the Pacific Ocean theatre of World War II
Military installations closed in 1995
1943 establishments in Oceania
1995 disestablishments in Oceania
Barrigada, Guam
Closed installations of the United States Navy